The 2018 Sudamérica Rugby Women's Sevens was the tournaments 15th edition and was hosted by Uruguay in Montevideo from 9–10 November. Brazil won their 14th South American title and qualified for a place in the 2018 Canada Women's Sevens. Brazil and Argentina also booked a place in the Women's Sevens Series qualifier that will be held at the 2019 Hong Kong Women's Sevens.

Teams

Pool stage

Pool A

Pool B

Finals

Cup Quarterfinals

Plate Semifinals

Final standings

References 

2018 in women's rugby union
2018 rugby sevens competitions
Rugby sevens competitions in South America
2018 in South American rugby union
November 2018 sports events in South America